This is a list of programs broadcast by RedeTV!, which has operated in Brazil since 1999. The programming of this network includes news, comedy, talk shows, music, reality shows, sports, series and variety shows.

The company also broadcasts on different channels, which also have specialized programs for different audiences. Most network programs are produced in the complex transmission network in the city of Osasco, São Paulo.

Current programs

Comedy 
Encrenca (2014–present)
João Kleber Show (2016-present)
Te Peguei (2013-present)

News 
Alerta Nacional (2020-present)
É Notícia (2008–2013, 2023-present)
Leitura Dinâmica (1999–present)
RedeTV! News (2005–present)

Sports 
Galera Esporte Clube (2021-present)
NFL Show (2022-present)

Reality shows

Game shows

Talk show 
Sensacional (2015-present)

Varieties 
A Tarde É Sua (2006–present)
Amaury Jr (2019-present)
Manhã do Ronnie (2022-present)
Superpop (1999-present)
TV Fama (1999; 2000–present)
Vou Te Contar (2020-present)

Miscellaneous programming

Game/reality shows 
 Chega Mais/Conexão Models (2015-2019)
 Entubados (2018)
 Sob Medida (2013-2015)
 The Bachelor Brasil (The Bachelor) (2014)
 Estação Teen (2012)
 Sexo a 3 (2012)
 O Último Passageiro (The Last Passenger) (2010-2013)
 Taxi do Milão (Cash Cab) (2010)
 Receita Pop (Ready Steady Cook) (2010)
 The Amazing Race: A Corrida Milionária (The Amazing Race) (2007-2008)
 Clube das Mulheres (2008)
 GAS Sound (2007-2008)
 Insomnia (2004-2007)
 Apartamento das Modelos (2002)
 Interligado (1999-2003; 2009-2011)
 Almoço com os Artistas/Ritmo Brasil (2003-2021)
 A Melhor Viagem (2019-2020)
 O Desafiante

Sports 
 UEFA Champions League
 UEFA Europa League
 Primera División de México
 Premier League
 Serie A
 Copa Sudamericana
 Süper Lig
 Copa do Brasil
 Brazilian Serie B
 Soccer São Paulo Championship (A1 and A2)
 Copa Paulista
 Copa São Paulo de Futebol Junior
 NBA 
 NBB
 Campeonato Paulista de Basquete
 Superliga Brasileira de Voleibol
 Circuito Brasileiro de Vôlei de Praia
 UFC
 Boxing
 XFC
 ONE Fighting Championship
 Showbol
 Monster Energy NASCAR Cup Series
 Champ Car
 Fórmula Truck
 A1 GP
 Copa Montana
 SuperBike Brasil Series
 Super Bowl LVI

News/Sports 
 Aconteceu
 Agora com Lacombe
 A Hora do Kajuru
 Belas na Rede
 Bola Dividida
 Bola na Rede
 Brasil TV!
 Data Venia
 Debate Brasil
 Denúncia Urgente
 Documento Verdade
 Jornal da TV!
 Mariana Godoy Entrevista
 NASCAR Show
 Notícias de Minas
 Notícias do Brasil
 Notícias RJ (after, RJ Notícias)
 Olha a Hora
 Opinião no Ar
 Papo de Bola
 RedeTV! E-Games
 RedeTV! Esporte
 RedeTV! Extreme Fighting
 Repórter Cidadão
 RTV!
 Se Liga Brasil
 Sem Rodeios
 Show Business
 Super Extremo
 Super Faixa do Esporte
 Tema Quente
 TV Economia
 TV Esporte
 TV Esporte Notícias
 UFC Sem Limites
 Vídeo Adrenalina
 Visão de Jogo

Variety 
 A Casa é Sua
 Bom Dia Mulher
 Bom Dia Você
 Canal Aberto
 Edu Guedes e Você
 Eu Vi na TV
 Fala Zuca
 Feira do Riso
 Funk Total
 Luciana By Night
 Manhã Maior
 Melhor Pra Você
 Nestlé e Você
 Olga
 Pânico na TV
 Programa do Jacaré
 Sábado Total
 Tarde Quente
 Teste de Fidelidade
 Te Vi na TV
 Tricotando
 Você na TV

Kids 
 Galera na TV
 Miguelito
 TV Clubinho
 TV Kids
 Vila Maluca

Dramaturgy 
 A Feiticeira
 Barrados no Baile
 Betty. a Feia
 Friends
 Jeannie
 Pedro, O Escamoso

Film 
 Cine Total
 Sessão Especial
 TV Arte
 TV Escolha
 TV Magia
 TV Terror

References

External links 
RedeTV! website 
RedeTV!'s shows 

RedeTV!